Robert Mayer White (February 13, 1923 – October 14, 2015) was an American meteorologist. He headed several national organizations, including the United States Weather Bureau, the Environmental Science Services Administration, the National Oceanic and Atmospheric Administration, and the National Academy of Engineering. He graduated from Harvard University and the Massachusetts Institute of Technology and was a member of the French Legion of Honor.

Biography
White was born in Boston and was an alumnus of Harvard University and the Massachusetts Institute of Technology, holding degrees in geology and meteorology.

He was the director of the United States Weather Bureau from 1963 to 1965, the first and only administrator of the Environmental Science Services Administration from 1965 to 1970, the first administrator of the National Oceanic and Atmospheric Administration from 1970 to 1977, president of the University Corporation for Atmospheric Research from 1980 to 1983, and president of the National Academy of Engineering from 1983 to 1995. He also was the first chairman of the World Climate Conference in 1979.

He is a member of the French Legion of Honor, and received the International Meteorological Organization Prize in 1980    and the Tyler Prize for Environmental Achievement in 1992. In 2014, he was honored by Congressman Frank R. Wolf for "groundbreaking contributions to the federal coordination of meteorology in the United States".

He lived in Chevy Chase, Maryland. On October 14, 2015, he died of complications of dementia. His brother, Theodore H. White, was a historian.

References

1923 births
2015 deaths
American meteorologists
Environmental Science Services Administration personnel
National Oceanic and Atmospheric Administration personnel
Harvard University alumni
Massachusetts Institute of Technology School of Science alumni
People from Boston
Recipients of the Legion of Honour
Neurological disease deaths in Maryland
Members of the American Philosophical Society